The link in a simplicial complex is a generalization of the neighborhood of a vertex in a graph. The link of a vertex encodes information about the local structure of the complex at the vertex.

Link of a vertex 

 As an example, suppose v is the top vertex of the tetrahedron at the left. Then the link of v is the triangle at the base of the tetrahedron. This is because, for each edge of that triangle, the join of v with the edge is a triangle (one of the three triangles at the sides of the tetrahedron); and the join of v with the triangle itself is the entire tetrahedron.
An alternative definition is: the link of a vertex  is the graph  constructed as follows.

Link of a face 
The definition of a link can be extended from a single vertex to any face. 

Examples 
The link of a vertex of a tetrahedron is a triangle – the three vertices of the link corresponds to the three edges incident to the vertex, and the three edges of the link correspond to the faces incident to the vertex. In this example, the link can be visualized by cutting off the vertex with a plane; formally, intersecting the tetrahedron with a plane near the vertex – the resulting cross-section is the link.

Another example is illustrated below. There is a two-dimensional simplicial complex. At the left, a vertex is marked in yellow. At the right, the link of that vertex is marked in green.

Properties 

Link and star 
A concept closely-related to the link is the star. 

In other words, it is the closure of the set  -- the set of simplices having  as a face.

So the link is a subset of the star. The star and link are related as follows:

 For any , . 

An example is illustrated below. There is a two-dimensional simplicial complex. At the left, a vertex is marked in yellow. At the right, the star of that vertex is marked in green.

See also 

 Vertex figure - a geometric concept similar to the simplicial link.

References

Geometry